Gokula is a 2009 Indian Kannada-language comedy drama film written, directed and co-produced by Prakash. It stars Vijay Raghavendra, Yash, Pooja Gandhi, Pawan and Nakshatra in the lead roles. Actress Ragini Dwivedi is featured in a special appearance in an item song. The soundtrack and original score is composed by Mano Murthy and the cinematography is by Sathya Hegde.

The film was launched on 27 November 2009.

Plot
The film is about four orphans who unite each other and plan to make quick bucks to lead a lively life. They enter an elderly couple home and try to loot the property in disguise of being their children. The situation turns very emotional as the day pass on and they become very attached to the couple.

Cast
 Vijay Raghavendra as Raja
 Yash as N. Raja
 Pooja Gandhi as Leela
 Pawan as Guru
 Raghuraj as Shankar
 Nakshatra as Maala
 Srinivasa Murthy
 Sumithra 
 Ravi Khale
 Kote Prabhakar
 Ragini Dwivedi as an item number

Soundtrack
The music of the film was composed by Mano Murthy. The audio album was released in September 2009.

Reception

Critical response 

A critic from The Times of India scored the film at 3 out of 5 stars and says "Vijaya Raghavendra, Yash, Pavan and Raghuraj are brilliant while Pooja Gandhi brings alive her character. Sumitra, Srinivasamurthy and Ravi Kale do justice to their roles. Nakshathra deserved a better role. While Sathya Hegde's camerawork is superb, Mano Murthy's music is all right". A critic from Deccan Herald wrote "The theme of filial love, in that sense, has been given mature treatment. Likewise, the costume design deserves mention for being meticulous and not spoiling the continuity of each character. Choreography is good too - Ragini is stylish, not giving enough reason to support the ‘item number’ controversy. Time to head to Gokula now". A critic from Bangalore Mirror wrote  "This is a film with a very good intention falling short for in utilising the screenplay to the maximum. One example is where the old man played by Srinivas Murthy is said to have saved his home once by sitting on a protest demonstration in front of the Vidhana Soudha. This incident is just a dialogue in the film instead of a good scene. Many characters do not reveal what they really are due to such cost-saving measures at the wrong places".

Box office performance
The film was completed successfully 50-days in main centres of Karnataka and became box office hit.

Awards and nominations

References

2009 films
2000s Kannada-language films
Indian comedy-drama films
Films scored by Mano Murthy
2009 comedy-drama films
2009 comedy films
2009 drama films